George Langford Layne (born October 9, 1978) is a former American football fullback in the National Football League. He was drafted by the Kansas City Chiefs in the fourth round of the 2001 NFL Draft after playing college football for TCU. He played for the Atlanta Falcons and San Diego Chargers.

References

1978 births
Living people
People from Alvin, Texas
Players of American football from Texas
American football running backs
TCU Horned Frogs football players
Atlanta Falcons players
San Diego Chargers players